Jai Herbert (born 13 May 1988) is an English mixed martial artist who currently fights as a lightweight in the Ultimate Fighting Championship. He is the former Cage Warriors lightweight champion and also competed in BAMMA.

Background 
Herbert was born in Wolverhampton, England. He spent 14 years as a scaffolder and worked a full-time job while competing as an amateur and professional. He didn't turn to full-time fighting until signing with the UFC. As an amateur fighter, Herbert competed at welterweight and didn't consider the strain of a weight cut to be worthwhile at such a level. In August 2020, Herbert was part of Wolverhampton Wanderers' kit launch.

Mixed martial arts career

Early career 
After going 9–1 as an amateur, Herbert made his professional MMA debut in 2015. He recorded consecutive second-round knockouts with Full Contact Contender and later signed a four-fight contract with BAMMA.

On 14 November 2015, Herbert made his promotional debut at BAMMA 23 and beat Ben Bennett via knockout in the second round. On 14 May 2016, he earned a second round submission against Tony Morgan at BAMMA 25. On 16 December, he suffered his first loss against future UFC fighter Rhys McKee in a lightweight title bout at BAMMA 27.

In February 2017, Herbert was due to face Steve Owens at BAMMA 28, but his opponent was forced to withdraw with illness the day before. On 12 May, Herbert beat Rick Selvarajah at BAMMA 29 via knockout in the second round.

In late 2017, Herbert voiced his displeasure about BAMMA's matchmaking. Due to an over-booking of fights by the promotion, Herbert saw a scheduled bout cancelled at late notice due to the number of tickets sold by the fighters. He announced he would not fight under the BAMMA promotion again and subsequently signed with Cage Warriors.

Cage Warriors 
On 16 June 2018, Herbert faced Erdi Karatas at Cage Warriors 94. He won by unanimous decision in the co-main event. He was then due to fight Donovan Desmae at Cage Warriors 98, but had to withdraw two weeks prior to the bout. On 8 December, he returned with a first round knockout against Joe McColgan at Cage Warriors 100.

On 2 March 2019, Herbert appeared in the co-main event at Cage Warriors 102 and beat Steve O'Keefe via a first round knockout. He was then handed his first title opportunity with the promotion and beat Jack Grant at Cage Warriors 106 to claim the vacant lightweight championship. On 26 October, he successfully defended his title against Cain Carrizosa at Cage Warriors 109 with a first round knockout.

Ultimate Fighting Championship 
In January 2020, Herbert signed with the UFC. He was due to face Marc Diakiese as a replacement at UFC Fight Night: Woodley vs. Edwards in March, but the event was later cancelled due to the COVID-19 pandemic.

On 25 July, Herbert faced Francisco Trinaldo at UFC on ESPN: Whittaker vs. Till. He lost the fight via knockout in round three.

Herbert faced Renato Moicano on June 26, 2021 at UFC Fight Night: Gane vs. Volkov. He lost the fight via a rear-naked choke in round two.

Herbert faced Khama Worthy on October 23, 2021 at UFC Fight Night: Costa vs. Vettori. He won the bout via TKO in round one.

Herbert was scheduled to face Mike Davis on March 19, 2022 at UFC Fight Night 204.  However, Davis withdrew from the bout due to personal reasons and he was replaced by Ilia Topuria. Herbert landed a head kick in the first round that dropped Topuria, but ultimately lost the fight via knockout in round two.

Herbert faced Kyle Nelson on July 23, 2022 at UFC Fight Night: Blaydes vs. Aspinall. He won the fight by unanimous decision.

Herbert faced Ľudovít Klein on March 18, 2023 at UFC 286. After a point deduction in the third round due to multiple groin strikes, the fight ended in a majority draw.

Championships and accomplishments

Mixed martial arts 

 Cage Warriors
 Cage Warriors Lightweight Championship (One time)
 One successful title defence
 Cage Warriors Academy South East Lightweight Championship (One time)

Mixed martial arts record 

|-
|Draw
|align=center|12–4–1
|Ľudovít Klein
|Draw (majority)
|UFC 286
|
|align=center|3
|align=center|5:00
|London, England
|
|-
|Win
|align=center|12–4
|Kyle Nelson
|Decision (unanimous)
|UFC Fight Night: Blaydes vs. Aspinall 
|
|align=center|3
|align=center|5:00
|London, England
|
|- 
|Loss
|align=center|11–4
|Ilia Topuria
|KO (punches)
|UFC Fight Night: Volkov vs. Aspinall
|
|align=center|2
|align=center|1:07
|London, England
|
|-
|Win
|align=center|11–3
|Khama Worthy
|TKO (punches)
|UFC Fight Night: Costa vs. Vettori
|
|align=center|1
|align=center|2:47
|Las Vegas, Nevada, United States
|
|- 
|Loss
|align=center|10–3
|Renato Moicano
|Submission (rear-naked choke)
|UFC Fight Night: Gane vs. Volkov 
|
|align=center|2
|align=center|4:36
|Las Vegas, Nevada, United States
|
|-
|Loss
|align=center|10–2
|Francisco Trinaldo
|TKO (punch)
|UFC on ESPN: Whittaker vs. Till
|
|align=center|3
|align=center|1:30
|Abu Dhabi, United Arab Emirates
|
|-
| Win
| align=center| 10–1
| Cain Carrizosa
| KO (knee)
| Cage Warriors 109
| 
| align=center|1
| align=center| 3:26
| Birmingham, England
| 
|-
| Win
| align=center| 9–1
| Jack Grant
| TKO (punches)
| Cage Warriors 106
| 
| align=center| 3
| align=center| 3:22
| London, England
| 
|-
| Win
| align=center| 8–1
| Steve O'Keefe
| TKO (punches)
| Cage Warriors 102
| 
| align=center| 1
| align=center| 4:07
| London, England
|
|-
| Win
| align=center| 7–1
| Joe McColgan
| TKO (punches)
| Cage Warriors 100
| 
| align=center| 1
| align=center| 2:00
| Cardiff, Wales
|
|-
| Win
| align=center| 6–1
| Erdi Karatas
| Decision (unanimous)
| Cage Warriors 94
| 
| align=center| 3
| align=center| 5:00
| Antwerp, Belgium
|
|-
| Win
| align=center| 5–1
| Rick Selvarajah
| TKO (punches)
| BAMMA 29
| 
| align=center| 2
| align=center| 0:37
| Birmingham, England
|
|-
| Loss
| align=center| 4–1
| Rhys McKee
| KO (punches)
| BAMMA 27
| 
| align=center| 1
| align=center| 1:47
| Dublin, Ireland
| 
|-
| Win
| align=center| 4–0
| Tony Morgan
| Submission (rear-naked choke)
| BAMMA 25
| 
| align=center| 2
| align=center| 2:19
| Birmingham, England
|
|-
| Win
| align=center| 3–0
| Ben Bennett
| KO (body kick)
| BAMMA 23
| 
| align=center| 2
| align=center| 3:59
| Birmingham, England
| 
|-
| Win
| align=center| 2–0
| Martin Sweeney
| TKO (punches)
| Full Contact Contender 13
| 
| align=center| 2
| align=center| 0:41
| Horwich, England
| 
|-
| Win
| align=center| 1–0
| Omid Muhammadi
| TKO (punches)
| Full Contact Contender 12
| 
| align=center| 2
| align=center| 0:22
| Horwich, England
|
|-

See also 

 List of current UFC fighters
 List of male mixed martial artists

References 

1988 births
Living people
English male mixed martial artists
Lightweight mixed martial artists
Mixed martial artists utilizing Muay Thai
Mixed martial artists utilizing Luta Livre
Mixed martial artists utilizing Brazilian jiu-jitsu
Ultimate Fighting Championship male fighters
English Muay Thai practitioners
English practitioners of Brazilian jiu-jitsu
Sportspeople from Wolverhampton